Ban Shirvan (also Romanized as Bān Shīrvān; also known as Bān Shīrvān-e Tofangchī) is a village in Qalkhani Rural District, Gahvareh District, Dalahu County, Kermanshah Province, Iran. At the 2006 census, its population was 79, in 14 families.

See also 
 Bi Bi Shirvan
 Shirvan

References 

Populated places in Dalahu County